Cookies is a band from Brooklyn, New York, specializing in popular music.  The band was formed by Ben Sterling, formerly of Mobius Band. Their music has been described as "pop music that is built to last" by The New Yorker and  "hip-hop-infused electro-pop" by Interview Magazine.

Discography 

Albums

 "Music For Touching"

Singles

 Summer Jam 10"
 Boycrazy 10"
 Wilderness Tips
 Crybaby

References

External links 
 Official Website

Musical groups from Brooklyn
American electronic music groups